My Wife, the Movie Star (German: Meine Frau, die Filmschauspielerin) is a 1919 German silent comedy film directed by Ernst Lubitsch and starring Ossi Oswalda, Paul Biensfeldt and Victor Janson.

Cast
 Ossi Oswalda as Ossi, der Filmstar der Fabrik
 Paul Biensfeldt as Dramaturg der Firma
 Victor Janson as Lachmann, Generaldirektor
 Max Kronert as Wastel, Hotelportier
 Julius Dewald as Erich von Schwind
 Hanns Kräly as Dramaturg der Firma

References

Bibliography
 Bock, Hans-Michael & Bergfelder, Tim. The Concise CineGraph. Encyclopedia of German Cinema. Berghahn Books, 2009.
 Eyman, Scott. Ernst Lubitsch: Laughter in Paradise. Johns Hopkins University Press, 2000.

External links

1919 films
Films of the Weimar Republic
German silent feature films
1919 comedy films
German comedy films
Films directed by Ernst Lubitsch
UFA GmbH films
German black-and-white films
Silent comedy films
1910s German films